George Seney may refer to:

 George E. Seney (1832–1905), politician, lawyer and judge from Ohio
 George I. Seney (1826–1893), New York City banker, art collector, and benefactor